Abaciscus kathmandensis is a species of moth belonging to the family Geometridae. It was described by Sato in 1993.

References

Boarmiini
Moths described in 1993